The Aero & Tech Nexth (or sometimes Next-H) is an Italian ultralight aircraft designed by  Morelli Luca and produced by Aero & Tech of Fossato di Vico. Introduced at the Aero show held in Friedrichshafen in 2011, the aircraft is intended to be supplied as a complete ready-to-fly aircraft.

Design and development
The Nexth complies with the Fédération Aéronautique Internationale microlight rules. A later version will comply with US light-sport aircraft rules.

The design features a cantilever mid-wing, two seats in side-by-side configuration, retractable tricycle landing gear made from titanium and a single  Rotax 912ULS four cylinder, liquid and air-cooled, four stroke engine in tractor configuration. Cockpit access is by two gull wing doors hinged at the top. The aircraft was designed to meet aerobatic category requirements, including +9 and -4.5 g.

The aircraft fuselage is an aluminum sheet covered steel space frame, based on Formula One racing construction techniques. Its  span wing employs winglets and flaps.

Marino Boric, writing in the World Directory of Leisure Aviation notes that the Nexth fuselage is an unusual multi-faceted shape reminiscent of stealth fighter design. The prototype was painted black, which adds to the resemblance.

Specifications (Nexth)

References

External links

2010s Italian ultralight aircraft
Single-engined tractor aircraft